Rolandas is a masculine Lithuanian given name and may refer to:

Rolandas Alijevas (born 1985), Lithuanian basketball player
Rolandas Baravykas (born 1995), Lithuanian footballer 
Rolandas Bernatonis (born 1987), Lithuanian handball player
Rolandas Džiaukštas (born 1978), Lithuanian footballer
Rolandas Gimbutis (born 1981), Lithuanian swimmer
Rolandas Jasevičius (born 1982), Lithuanian boxer
Rolandas Karčemarskas (born 1980), Lithuanian footballer
Rolandas Kazlas (born 1969), Lithuanian actor and theater director
Rolandas Maščinskas (born 1992), Lithuanian rower
Rolandas Muraška (born 1973), Lithuanian tennis player
Rolandas Paksas (born 1956), Lithuanian politician and President of Lithuania
Rolandas Paulauskas (born 1954), Lithuanian journalist and politician
Rolandas Pavilionis (1944–2006), Lithuanian philosopher and politician
Rolandas Urbonas, Lithuanian paralympic athlete
Rolandas Valiūnas (born 1965), Lithuanian lawyer
Rolandas Verkys (born 1966), Lithuanian high jumper

Lithuanian masculine given names